Dave Salzwedel (born June 15, 1968 in Thousand Oaks, California) is a retired U.S. soccer goalkeeper who played two seasons in Major League Soccer with the San Jose Clash.  He also played one season in the American Professional Soccer League and USISL.

Salzwedel attended Calabasas High School.  He then played collegiate soccer for California Lutheran University where he was a two-time NAIA All American.   He was inducted into the school's Hall of Fame in 2003.  He tried out with the San Diego Sockers, but was cut in the final round of the trials.  He returned to Cal Lutheran and worked as an assistant coach for the next six seasons.  In 1992, tried out with the San Francisco Bay Blackhawks of the American Professional Soccer League at the suggestion of Eric Wynalda, a childhood friend.  He spent most of the season as a backup to Mark Dougherty, but played two games when Dougherty was injured.  In 1993, the owner of the Blackhawks moved the team to the lower USISL and renamed it the San Jose Hawks.  Following the season, the team folded.  Salzwedel continued to play for amateur clubs, most notably the Los Angeles Soccer Club, until Major League Soccer began holding trials at the end of 1995.  Salzwedel impressed the scouts enough to be drafted in the eighth round of the 1996 MLS Inaugural Player Draft by the San Jose Clash.   Salzwedel played two seasons before being released by the Clash.   He was drafted in the third round of the 1998 MLS Supplemental Draft by the New England Revolution, but was released during the season.

Salzwedel currently coaches boys and girls soccer at the Oakwood School in Morgan Hill, California.  He has also opened two camps, one for soccer and one for all sports.

References

External links
 Cal Lutheran Hall of Fame inductees
 MLS stats

Living people

1968 births
American soccer coaches
American soccer players
American Professional Soccer League players
Association football goalkeepers
Los Angeles Soccer Club players
Major League Soccer players
San Francisco Bay Blackhawks players
San Jose Earthquakes players
San Jose Hawks players
USISL players
Soccer players from California
New England Revolution draft picks